Taungthaman Thitsar is a 2006 Burmese drama film, directed by Maung Nanda starring Yan Aung, May Than Nu, Ye Aung, Nawarat, Dwe and Nandar Hlaing.

Cast
Yan Aung as Kaung Myat
May Than Nu as Khin Oo
Ye Aung as Kyaw Swar Oo
Nawarat as Sate Htar Myat
Dwe as Pone Nya
Nandar Hlaing as Yupar / Daw Khin Khin Myat (dual role)

Awards

References

2006 films
2000s Burmese-language films
Burmese drama films
Films shot in Myanmar
2006 drama films